Animusic, LLC is a dormant animation company specializing in the 3D visualization of MIDI-based music. Founded by Wayne Lytle, it is currently a registered limited liability company in New York and had offices in Texas and California during its active stages. The initial name of the company was Visual Music, but was changed to Animusic in 1995.

The company is known for its Animusic compilations of computer-generated animations, based on MIDI events processed to simultaneously drive the music and on-screen action, leading to and corresponding to every sound. The animated short "Pipe Dream," showed at SIGGRAPH's Electronic Theater in 2001, details the use of this specific sequencing.

Unlike many other music visualizations, Animusic uses MIDI information to drive the animation, while other software programs, such as Blender, animate figures or characters to the music. Any animated models in Animusic are created first, and are then programmed to follow what the music, or MIDI information, instructs them to do.

Many of the instruments appear to be robotic or play themselves using seemingly curious methods to produce and visualize the original compositions. The animations typically feature dramatically-lit rooms or landscapes in rustic and/or futuristic locales.

The music in Animusic is principally pop-rock based, consisting of straightforward sequences of triggered samples and digital patches. According to the director's comments on Animusic 2, most instrument sounds are generated with software synthesizers on a music workstation (see Software Programs for more info). Many sounds resemble stock patches available on digital keyboards, subjected to some manipulation, such as pitch or playback speed, to enhance the appeal of their timbre.

Releases
, three video albums have been released.

Animusic: A Computer Animation Video Album (2001)
Animusic 2: A New Computer Animation Video Album (2005)
Animusic HD: Stunning Computer-Animated Music (2010)

Animusic was released in 2001 on VHS, and later DVD, with a special edition DVD being released later in 2004. This special edition included extra material, such as Animusic's first animation, "Beyond the Walls". A second album, Animusic 2, was released in the United States in 2005. Later, in 2008, this volume was released in Japan through a distribution deal with Japanese company Jorudan, Co. Ltd. In a company newsletter, it was announced that the Animusic company would also be producing a high-definition version of Animusic 2 on Blu-ray, to be released sometime before their third major album, Animusic 3. This HD compilation was eventually released in November 2010, featuring all of the animations featured in Animusic 2, as well as the animation "Pipe Dream" from Animusic encoded at a high bitrate. In a later newsletter, the working titles of three animations in Animusic 3, “Sonic Warfare”, “Paddle Ball” and “Super Pipe Dream”, were revealed. In 2012, a Kickstarter campaign for Animusic 3 was successfully funded. "The Sound of Twelve," a music-only album made using similar harmonics as Animusic, was released in March 2015. Animusic 3 was never finished or released.

There was an internet rumor that suggested that the "Pipe Dream" video was actually a machine created at the University of Iowa from farm machinery parts. Although this has been proven false, the rumor was still considered "pretty amusing" to the Animusic staff. Intel later commissioned a version of the machine to be built which was demonstrated at IDF 2011.

Animusic 3 
Animusic, in its former state with multiple employees, was working on the third volume of the Animusic series for over 10 years. It was initially intended to be released sometime in 2010, featuring animations such as "Sonic Warfare", "Paddle Ball", and "Super Pipe Dream". However, this release date passed with no definitive word regarding the volume's progress. A year later in November 2010, Animusic attributed this delay to a complete restructuring of their modeling and rendering software, ultimately yielding the Animusic|Studio software program.

On August 6, 2012, the company began a Kickstarter campaign aimed at raising $200,000 USD to fund the completion of the Animusic 3. This campaign was featured on several websites such as Animation World Network. A rough mix from the newly revealed music album The Sound of 12, titled "Glarpedge," was released online on August 28, 2012. On August 31, 2012, two more mixes were released: "Emoticondria" and "EchoKrunch." The Kickstarter page was later updated to confirm that a Blu-ray edition of Animusic 3 would be released shortly following the DVD's completion.

On September 5, 2012, the Kickstarter campaign ended successfully, with a final backing amount of $223,123. Animusic posted expected shipping dates of October 2013 for the DVD, and February 2014 for the Blu-ray disc. However, both dates passed without either product being released.

On a Kickstarter update in August 2015, Wayne Lytle announced some other factors that have delayed the project, including Dave Crognale's departure from the project and new residence in California, personal struggles, and physical stress and injury To make up for this, the team utilized the distribution of supplemental prizes for backers to try and ease those who had funded the campaign, and assure them that there would be a quick resolution. Lytle had noted in this particular update that his financial situation was so unfortunate to the point where he, his mother and father, and his wife were unable to pay for shipping postage for the remainder of the inventory. However, Lytle insisted on his determination to finish the project, expressing his excitement about the abilities of the newly-implemented Unreal Engine 4 and his gratitude for those who have invested in him. Lytle stated that he had withheld from posting an update until he had a completion date, but did not give one in the update.

Since the 2015 Kickstarter update, no further updates have been posted on the platform. In August 2017, the Animusic headquarters was sold to RP Solutions, Inc. The Lytle residence was sold to a separate buyer. This information was yielded using New York State property searching tools, including but not limited to arcGIS, and was not directly obtained via an update from Wayne Lytle or his counterparts.

In August 2019, the Animusic website was briefly taken down and replaced by a generic template with a small explanation that the site is undergoing a redesign.

According to the New York State Division of Corporations, State Records, and UCC, Animusic is still an active domestic limited liability company and is registered to an address in Cortland, New York. The status of Wayne Lytle is publicly unknown, however, the Cortland property that the limited liability company is registered under has been sold as of November, 2021.

Software programs
According to the company's FAQ, animation is created procedurally with their own proprietary MIDImotion engine. Discreet 3D Studio Max was used for modeling, lighting, cameras, and rendering. Maps were painted with Corel Painter, Deep Paint 3D, and Photoshop. They have also created their own software called ANIMUSIC|studio that is based on scene-graph technology. According to an August 2015 newsletter, Animusic was using Unreal Engine 4 for the production of Animusic 3.

Animations 
 
 Various animations for SIGGRAPH
 More Bells and Whistles (1990) – made by Wayne Lytle before creating Animusic
 Beyond the Walls (known as Concerto in 3D if watched in stereoscope) (1996) – the first animation made under the name of Animusic, produced for VRex (a manufacturer of stereoscopic glasses and projectors). This animation is included as a bonus feature on the Animusic special edition DVD.
 Kansas – Device, Voice, Drum (2002) – animation for an intro to the band's concert and a music-only bridge in one of the tracks "Miracles Out of Nowhere"; album cover. This animation incorporates several instruments from the first album, including the drum kit from Future Retro and the bass guitar tower from Harmonic Voltage.

Animusic: A Computer Animation Video Album 
Tracklist:
 Future Retro (4:24)
 Stick Figures (5:23)
 Aqua Harp (3:47)
 Drum Machine (3:22)
 Pipe Dream (3:22)
 Acoustic Curves (5:32)
 Harmonic Voltage (6:46)

Animusic CD bonus tracks 
There were also 3 other music pieces only available on the Animusic audio CD.
 
 Seventh Alloy (4:27)
 A Slight Delay (6:07)
 The Harvester (5:40)

Animusic 2: A New Computer Animation Video Album 
Tracklist: 
 Starship Groove (3:49)
 Pogo Sticks (3:17)
 Resonant Chamber (4:20)
 Cathedral Pictures (6:00)
 Pipe Dream 2 (4:01)
 Fiber Bundles (5:13)
 Gyro Drums (3:51)
 Heavy Light (6:24)

Animusic 2 CD bonus tracks 
The bonus audio tracks on this CD consist of reduced versions of "Heavy Light" and "Fiber Bundles":
 
 Heavy Light – Drum/Bass Submix
 Fiber Bundles – Drum/Bass Submix
 Fiber Bundles – Synth/Ambient Submix

References

External links

Software companies based in New York (state)
Computer animation
Music visualization
PBS original programming
PBS Kids shows
1990s video albums
2000s video albums
Visual music
Software companies of the United States